In Modern Times is an album by the American jazz group Spyro Gyra, released in 2001 by Heads Up International. This album reached No. 2 on Billboard's Contemporary Jazz chart.

Track listing 
"After Hours" (Jay Beckenstein, Chuck Loeb) - 5:08
"Feelin' Fine" (Jay Beckenstein) - 4:23
"Julio's Party" (Julio Fernandez) - 5:08
"The River Between" (Scott Ambush) - 6:45
"Groovin for Grover" (Tom Schuman) - 5:50
"Open Door" (Julio Fernandez) - 4:38
"Florida Straits" (Jay Beckenstein) - 4:18
"Feelin' Fine Pt. 2" (Jay Beckenstein, Chuck Loeb) - 4:04
"East River Blue" (Jay Beckenstein) - 6:14
"Your Touch" (Jay Beckenstein, Tom Schuman) - 5:10
"Lucky Bounce" (Jeremy Wall) - 4:18
"Planet J" (Joel Rosenblatt, Phil Magallanes) - 4:42

Personnel 

Spyro Gyra
 Jay Beckenstein – saxophones
 Tom Schuman – keyboards
 Julio Fernández – guitars
 Scott Ambush – bass
 Joel Rosenblatt – drums

Additional musicians
 David Charles – percussion
 Marc Quiñones – percussion (7)
 Andrew Lippman – trombone (12)
 No Sweat Horns
 Scott Kreitzer – tenor saxophone 
 Randy Andos – trombone 
 Barry Danielian – trumpet, horn arrangements

Charts

References

External links
Spyro Gyra-In Modern Times at Discogs
Spyro Gyra-In Modern Times at AllMusic
Spyro Gyra official web site

2001 albums
Spyro Gyra albums
Heads Up International albums